Tsunatori Dam  is a gravity dam located in Iwate Prefecture in Japan. The dam is used for flood control and water supply. The catchment area of the dam is 83 km2. The dam impounds about 79  ha of land when full and can store 15000 thousand cubic meters of water. The construction of the dam was started on 1972 and completed in 1982.

See also
List of dams in Japan

References

Dams in Iwate Prefecture